|}

The King Charles II Stakes is a Listed flat horse race in Great Britain open to horses aged three years only.
It is run at Newmarket over a distance of 7 furlongs (1,408 metres), and it is scheduled to take place each year in May during Newmarket's Guineas Festival. Prior to 2022 it was run at a meeting in mid-May.

Records

Leading jockey (3 wins):
Ray Cochrane  – Rawnak (1988), Magical Strike (1989), Eurolink Thunder (1993))

Leading trainer (4 wins):
Sir Michael Stoute – Magical Strike (1989), Jeremy (2006), Thikriyaat (2016), Taamol (2017)

Winners since 1988

See also 
Horse racing in Great Britain
List of British flat horse races

References
Racing Post:

Flat races in Great Britain
Flat horse races for three-year-olds
Newmarket Racecourse